Balmangan (also Romanized as Bālmangān) is a village in Doshman Ziari Rural District, Doshman Ziari District, Mamasani County, Fars Province, Iran. At the 2006 census, its population was 40, in 11 families.

References 

Populated places in Mamasani County